The Best Offer ( – entitled Deception in the UK) is a 2013 Australian-English-language Italian psychological thriller film written and directed by Giuseppe Tornatore. The film stars Geoffrey Rush, Jim Sturgess, Sylvia Hoeks, and Donald Sutherland. The music score was composed by Ennio Morricone.

Plot
The film tells a story of love and deceit, set in Europe - in the world of ultra high-end art auctions and antiques. The story revolves around Virgil Oldman (Geoffrey Rush), an ageing, wealthy, and esteemed, but somewhat standoffish and eccentric, managing director of a preeminent auction house. Oldman is hired by a mysterious young heiress, Claire Ibbetson (Sylvia Hoeks), to auction off the large collection of art and antiques left to her by her parents. Claire always refuses to be seen in person, suffering from severe agoraphobia and never leaving her room. She decided to trust Oldman though as he suffers himself from OCD. Soon enough Virgil, a lifelong bachelor who is able to relate to her reclusiveness, understands that he has fallen in love with her.

An astute young artisan, Robert (Jim Sturgess), who has a shop repairing and restoring clocks, aids Oldman in restoring and reassembling some odd mechanical parts that he finds among Claire's belongings, which appear to be from a potentially valuable historic automaton, while also giving him advice on how to befriend her, and how to deal with his feelings towards her. Oldman's poise and prestige are counterpointed by an ongoing scam whereby his friend Billy Whistler (Donald Sutherland) helps him acquire a large private collection of master portraits worth many millions, by presenting them at auction as the work of other artists.  Billy is an aspiring artist himself, but Oldman does not take Billy's work seriously.

A side narrative involves Virgil discovering a mouldy, charred piece of wood at another client's mansion.  Professional restoration reveals a painting underneath which Virgil falsely states is by a 16th-century forger who, unable to reveal herself as female, simply signs paintings as "V."  Virgil notes to these other clients that all forgers are irresistibly tempted to modify the original, which reveals the forger's own artistic sensibilities.  At auction, the painting is sold for £90,000, but after Virgil explains to Billy he knew that it was, in fact, an original worth some £8 million, Billy buys the painting for Virgil from its original buyer for £250,000.

Oldman eventually begins a relationship with Ibbetson, compromising his work. At the peak of the relationship, Claire overcomes her fear of the outside world and Virgil lays aside his gloves. Claire goes on to live with Virgil, who trusts the fragile Claire enough to show her his secret priceless collection of female portraits. Overcome with emotion, Claire tells Virgil that no matter what may happen to the two of them, she does love him.  

Virgil returns home one day to find that his entire collection and Claire are gone. In the vault is the completed automaton constructed from the mechanical parts Virgil gave to Robert, which plays a message from Robert saying there is something real in every forgery and that is why Robert will truly miss Virgil. He also discovers that a supposed portrait of Claire's mother was in fact painted by Billy and has been left to him with a telling inscription. Virgil realizes that he is the victim of an elaborate fraud conducted by Robert, Claire, and Billy, but is unable to go to the police due to the illicit means by which Virgil himself acquired the works. He also discovers that the real "Claire," owner of the villa and its contents, is a young savant, disabled and confined to a wheelchair, who has been watching him visit the villa on numerous occasions from a café across the street in which Virgil has himself spent time. She reveals that she has hired the villa out to some film directors for this whole event to be staged, and has seen the supposedly agoraphobic, fake "Claire" come and go from the villa hundreds of times. 

We (the audience) are not told explicitly who is behind the "sting" or scam, but at one prior point Claire, unaware that she is being observed by Virgil, talks to someone on the phone who she calls the "Director;" if this is Billy, a possible motive is that he too is an artist but has never received any encouragement or appreciation from Virgil, and the sting is an act of revenge on his part. 
An alternative suggestion by some viewers is that Billy, and possibly Robert, wish to draw Virgil out of his previous life in which he had little real contact or empathy with other humans, and the loss of his possessions may be a price he has to pay to gain the insights he has hitherto avoided.

After months of recovering from the betrayal in a mental institution, Virgil takes a trip to Prague, where he spends time sitting in a restaurant that Claire had once suggested. The restaurant is filled with clocks, perhaps a reminder of his OCD or perhaps a metaphor for his own life ticking by. He sits there waiting alone at a table wondering if Claire's statement of love was forged or a genuine sentiment she imparted on the con.

Cast
 Geoffrey Rush as Virgil Oldman, prestigious auctioneer
 Jim Sturgess as Robert, tinkerer and mechanical repairman
 Sylvia Hoeks as Claire Ibbetson, reclusive heiress
 Donald Sutherland as Billy Whistler, artist; friend of Virgil who helps him at auctions
 Philip Jackson as Fred, caretaker of the Ibbetson mansion
 Katie McGovern as art expert
 Dermot Crowley as Lambert (Virgil's main assistant)
 Liya Kebede as Sarah, Robert's girlfriend
 Maximilian Dirr as Virgil's twink
 Laurence Belgrave as Virgil's Assistant
 Sean Buchanan as Virgil's Assistant
 Kiruna Stamell as Claire, woman in the bar who keeps count of things
 Anton Alexander as Real Estate Agent
 John Benfield as Barman
 Miles Richardson as Steirereck Maitre
 James Patrick Conway as Steirereck Manager
 Brigitte Christensen as First Daughter

Production
The film was produced by Paco Cinematografica with support from the FVG (Friuli Venezia Giulia) Film Fund. Filming began in Trieste on April 30, 2012. For Tornatore this meant a return to Trieste: it was here he shot La Sconosciuta in 2005, with Xenia Rappoport. Filming took place in a period of five to six weeks in the region of Friuli-Venezia Giulia, Vienna, Prague, and South Tyrol.

Reception

Critical reception
The Best Offer received mixed reviews. On Rotten Tomatoes, the film has a score of 55%, with an average rating of 5.84/10, based on reviews from 33 critics. On Metacritic, the film holds a score of 49 (out of 100), based on reviews from 17 critics, indicating "mixed or average reviews". Andrew Pulver of The Guardian rated it 2/5 stars and called it "stiff" and "convoluted". Philippa Hawker of The Age rated it 3/5 stars and called it "handsome, yet austere". Sandra Hall of the Brisbane Times rated it 4/5 stars and praised Geoffrey Rush's acting. Deborah Young of The Hollywood Reporter called it "astutely written". Variety called the film "superficial" and "clichéd", but predicted box office success.

Box office
On the Italian opening weekend, the film grossed $2,496,402 from 373 theaters and debuted at number 2 on the box office chart, behind Us in the U.S.. It grossed $12,021,662 domestically and $8,468,038 overseas for a worldwide gross of $20,489,700.

Accolades

References

External links
  
 
 
 

2013 films
Films directed by Giuseppe Tornatore
English-language Italian films
Italian drama films
Italian romance films
Italian crime films
2010s mystery films
Films about the visual arts
Films scored by Ennio Morricone
Films set in Milan
Films set in Prague
Films set in Vienna
Films set in Rome
Films shot in the Czech Republic
Films about con artists
Films set in Trieste
2010s English-language films